The House Order of Hohenzollern ( or ) was a dynastic order of knighthood of the House of Hohenzollern awarded to military commissioned officers and civilians of comparable status. Associated with the various versions of the order were crosses and medals which could be awarded to lower-ranking soldiers and civilians.

History
These two principalities in southern Germany were Catholic collateral lines of the House of Hohenzollern, cousins to the Protestant ruling house of Prussia.

On 23 August 1851, after the two principalities had been annexed by Prussia, the order was adopted by the Prussian branch of the house. Also, although the two principalities had become an administrative region of the Prussian kingdom, the princely lines continued to award the order as a house order.  The Prussian version was then known as the Royal House Order of Hohenzollern ( or ), to distinguish it from the Princely House Order of Hohenzollern ( or ).  Although Kaiser Wilhelm II abdicated in 1918 as German Emperor and King of Prussia, he did not relinquish his role as Head of the Royal House and as such he was still able to confer the Royal House Order. The Princely House Order continued to be awarded, unofficially, after the fall of the German Monarchy.

Another development occurred in 1935. Prince Karl Anton's second son, Karl Eitel Friedrich of Hohenzollern-Sigmaringen, had become prince and then king of Romania as Carol I. Carol I had died childless and was succeeded by his nephew Ferdinand I, also of Hohenzollern-Sigmaringen. This form of the order existed until the Romanian monarchy was abolished in 1947; King Michael also awarded a slightly altered order in exile.

Classes

Royal House Order
The Royal House Order of Hohenzollern came in the following classes:

 Grand Commander
 Commander
 Knight
 Member

"Member" was a lesser class for soldiers who were not officers, as well as civilians. The Members' Cross, especially with swords, was a rare distinction for non-commissioned officers and the like. Another decoration, the Members' Eagle was often given as a long-service award to lesser officials such as schoolteachers. The "Eagles" (the Members' Eagle and the Knights' Eagle, or ) were solely civilian awards, and could not be awarded with swords. All other grades could be awarded with swords. When awarded with swords it was worn on the ribbon of the Iron Cross.

Princely House Order
The Princely House Order of Hohenzollern came in the following classes:

 Cross of Honour 1st Class
 Commander's Cross of Honour
 Cross of Honour 2nd Class
 Cross of Honour 3rd Class
 Golden Cross of Merit
 Silver Cross of Merit
 Golden Medal of Honour
 Silver Medal of Merit

The Crosses of Merit, Golden Medal of Honour and Silver Medal of Merit were lesser grades for non-commissioned officers, enlisted men and their civilian equivalents. All grades could be awarded with swords. Soldier in the regiment's sister reserve and  regiments also often received the decoration. Unlike the Royal House Order, awards of the Princely House Order were made on the standard ribbon of the order (the "statute" ribbon) regardless of whether they were with or without swords.

Romanian House Order
The classes of the Romanian version of the House Order were essentially the same as those of the Princely House Order, except that the Cross of Honour 3rd Class of the Romanian version could be awarded with Oak leaves, and the Golden and Silver Medals could be awarded with a Crown.  As with the Prussian and Hohenzollern versions, crossed swords could be used to indicate a wartime or combat award. Given the short existence of the order and the fact that Romania had a number of other decorations for valor and military merit (Order of Michael the Brave, Order of the Star of Romania, Order of the Crown of Romania, Air Force Bravery Order, Cross of Military Virtue, Air Force and Naval Bravery Crosses, Crosses and Medals for Faithful Service, Medals for Steadfastness and Loyalty), awards of the Romanian version of the House Order with swords are uncommon.

Insignia
The badge of the House Order of Hohenzollern was a cross pattée with convex edges and curved arms (sometimes called an "Alisee" cross).  There were differences in the enameling of the arms of the cross for the Royal, Princely and Romanian versions, but all featured white enamel on the higher classes and a black enameled stripe near the sides of the cross.  Between the arms of the cross was a wreath of laurel leaves (left side) and oak leaves (right side).

The cross bore a center medallion; the medallion and its band bore different coats of arms, mottos, dates and ciphers for each of the Royal, Princely and Romanian versions:

 The white-enameled medallion of the Royal House Order of Hohenzollern bore a black Prussian royal eagle with the Hohenzollern house coat of arms on a shield on the eagle's chest. Around the center medallion, a gold-rimmed band of blue enamel bore the motto in gold letters:  ("From the cliffs to the sea"), with a wreath of laurel below.  The white-enameled medallion on the reverse bore the cipher of King Frederick William IV of Prussia, the king when the order was founded.  A gold-rimmed band of blue enamel bore the date  with a wreath of laurel leaves (left side) and oak leaves (right side).
 The white-enameled medallion of the Princely House Order of Hohenzollern bore the Hohenzollern coat of arms (a quartered shield of black and white) under a princely crown. Around the center medallion, a gold-rimmed band of blue enamel bore the motto in gold letters:  ("For loyalty and merit") with a smaller wreath of oak leaves below. On most grades, the white-enameled medallion on the reverse bore the intertwined ciphers ("F" and "A") of Princes Friedrich (Konstantin's actual first name) and Anton, the princes who founded the order, under a princely crown.

 The white-enameled medallion of the Romanian House Order bore a black Romanian eagle with the Hohenzollern coat of arms on a shield on the eagle's chest.  Around the center medallion, a gold-rimmed band of blue enamel bore the motto in gold letters:  ("Nothing without God").  The white-enameled medallion on the reverse bore the crowned cipher of King Carol. The gold-rimmed band of blue enamel bore the date of the founding of the Romanian kingdom, .

The statute ribbon of the order was white with three black stripes (with slight variations among the Royal, Princely and Romanian versions).

Notable recipients 

As noted above, the Knight's Cross with Swords of the Royal House Order was the intermediate decoration between the Iron Cross 1st Class and the Pour le Mérite for Prussian junior officers. There were over 8,000 awards during World War I of this class (there were far fewer awards of the other classes, or of any class before the war).

Grand Commanders

 Prince Adalbert of Prussia (1811–1873)
 Prince Adalbert of Prussia (1884–1948)
 Prince Albert of Prussia (1809–1872)
 Prince Albert of Prussia (1837–1906)
 Prince Alexander of Prussia
 Prince Arnulf of Bavaria
 Prince August Wilhelm of Prussia
 Theobald von Bethmann Hollweg
 Herbert von Bismarck
 Otto von Bismarck
 Borwin, Duke of Mecklenburg
 Julius von Bose
 Felix Graf von Bothmer
 Paul Bronsart von Schellendorff
 Bernhard von Bülow
 Karl von Bülow
 Leo von Caprivi
 Prince Charles of Prussia
 Prince Christian of Schleswig-Holstein
 Constantine, Prince of Hohenzollern-Hechingen
 Edward VII
 Prince Eitel Friedrich of Prussia
 Ernest Louis, Grand Duke of Hesse
 Archduke Eugen of Austria
 Botho zu Eulenburg
 Archduke Franz Ferdinand of Austria
 Franz Joseph I of Austria
 Frederick Francis II, Grand Duke of Mecklenburg-Schwerin
 Frederick III, German Emperor
 Prince Frederick of Hohenzollern-Sigmaringen
 Prince Frederick of Prussia (1794–1863)
 George V
 Gustaf V
 Gustav, Prince of Vasa
 Gottlieb Graf von Haeseler
 Wilhelm von Hahnke
 Prince Henry of Prussia (1862–1929)
 Heinrich VII, Prince Reuss of Köstritz
 Prince Hermann of Saxe-Weimar-Eisenach (1825–1901)
 Karl Eberhard Herwarth von Bittenfeld
 Paul von Hindenburg
 Prince Joachim of Prussia
 Prince Johann Georg of Hohenzollern
 Karl Anton, Prince of Hohenzollern
 Karl Friedrich, Prince of Hohenzollern
 Karl Theodor, Duke in Bavaria
 Gustav von Kessel
 Leopold II of Belgium
 Prince Leopold of Bavaria
 Leopold, Prince of Hohenzollern
 Walter von Loë
 Louis IV, Grand Duke of Hesse
 Louis Ferdinand, Prince of Prussia
 Erich Ludendorff
 August von Mackensen
 Maria Emanuel, Margrave of Meissen
 Prince Maximilian of Baden
 Grand Duke Michael Alexandrovich of Russia
 Helmuth von Moltke the Elder
 Georg Alexander von Müller
 Oscar II
 Alexander August Wilhelm von Pape
 Hans von Plessen
 Prince Friedrich Wilhelm of Prussia
 Albrecht von Roon
 Rudolf, Crown Prince of Austria
 Alfred von Schlieffen
 Otto Graf zu Stolberg-Wernigerode
 Alfred von Tirpitz
 Victor I, Duke of Ratibor
 Prince Waldemar of Prussia (1889–1945)
 Alfred von Waldersee
 Wilhelm II, German Emperor
 William I, German Emperor
 William II of Württemberg
 William Ernest, Grand Duke of Saxe-Weimar-Eisenach
 William, Prince of Hohenzollern
 William, Prince of Wied
 Friedrich Graf von Wrangel

Commanders 

 Hans Hartwig von Beseler
 Moritz von Bissing
 Adolf von Deines
 Karl von Einem
 Prince Heinrich of Hesse and by Rhine
 Henning von Holtzendorff
 Gilbert Hamilton
 Dietrich von Hülsen-Haeseler
 Friedrich von Ingenohl
 Georg von der Marwitz
 Philipp, Prince of Eulenburg
 Walther Reinhardt
 Gustav von Senden-Bibran
 Julius von Verdy du Vernois

Honor Crosses 

 Prince Adalbert of Prussia (1811–1873)
 Prince Adalbert of Prussia (1884–1948)
 Duke Adolf Friedrich of Mecklenburg
 Adolphus Frederick VI, Grand Duke of Mecklenburg-Strelitz
 Adolphus Frederick V, Grand Duke of Mecklenburg-Strelitz
 Albert I of Belgium
 Albert, 8th Prince of Thurn and Taxis
 Prince Albert of Prussia (1809–1872)
 Prince Albert of Prussia (1837–1906)
 Albrecht, Duke of Württemberg
 Prince Alexander of Prussia
 Prince Alfons of Bavaria
 Alfred, 2nd Prince of Montenuovo
 Prince Anton of Hohenzollern-Sigmaringen
 Prince Arnulf of Bavaria
 Prince August, Duke of Dalarna
 Prince August Wilhelm of Prussia
 Prince Augustus of Prussia
 Theobald von Bethmann Hollweg
 Werner von Blomberg
 Felix Graf von Bothmer
 Paul von Bruns
 Carol I of Romania
 Charles Egon III, Prince of Fürstenberg
 Kurt von der Chevallerie
 Eduard, Duke of Anhalt
 Prince Eitel Friedrich of Prussia
 Ernest Louis, Grand Duke of Hesse
 Ferdinand I of Romania
 Hermann von François
 Prince Franz of Bavaria
 Frederick Francis III, Grand Duke of Mecklenburg-Schwerin
 Frederick III, German Emperor
 Prince Frederick of Hohenzollern-Sigmaringen
 Frederick, Prince of Hohenzollern
 Prince Frederick of Prussia (1794–1863)
 Frederick William IV of Prussia
 Archduke Friedrich, Duke of Teschen
 Maximilian Egon II, Prince of Fürstenberg
 Georg Alexander, Duke of Mecklenburg
 Colmar Freiherr von der Goltz
 Prince Henry of Prussia (1862–1929)
 Prince Hermann of Saxe-Weimar-Eisenach (1825–1901)
 Karl Eberhard Herwarth von Bittenfeld
 Wilhelm Heye
 Dietrich von Hülsen-Haeseler
 Joseph, Duke of Saxe-Altenburg
 Prince Karl Anton of Hohenzollern
 Karl Anton, Prince of Hohenzollern
 Prince Karl Theodor of Bavaria
 Karl Theodor, Duke in Bavaria
 Werner Kienitz
 Leopold, Hereditary Prince of Anhalt
 Prince Leopold of Bavaria
 Leopold, Prince of Hohenzollern
 Friedrich Wilhelm von Lindeiner-Wildau
 Fritz von Loßberg
 Manuel II of Portugal
 Franz Mattenklott
 Prince Maximilian of Baden
 Klemens von Metternich
 August Ludwig von Nostitz
 Oscar I of Sweden
 Alexander August Wilhelm von Pape
 Pedro V of Portugal
 Prince Philippe, Count of Flanders
 Karl von Plettenberg
 Georg-Wilhelm Postel
 Antoni Wilhelm Radziwiłł
 Walther Reinhardt
 Duke Robert of Württemberg
 Rupprecht, Crown Prince of Bavaria
 Alfred von Schlieffen
 August Schmidt (Luftwaffe)
 Walther Schroth
 Emil Uzelac
 Victor I, Duke of Ratibor
 Prince Waldemar of Prussia (1889–1945)
 Wilhelm II, German Emperor
 Wilhelm Karl, Duke of Urach
 Prince Wilhelm of Prussia (1783–1851)
 William I, German Emperor
 William II of Württemberg
 William, Prince of Hohenzollern
 William, Prince of Wied
 Hans Ritter von Adam
 Karl Allmenröder
 Ernst Freiherr von Althaus
 Hans am Ende
 Joachim von Amsberg (general)
 Karl Angerstein
 Lothar von Arnauld de la Perière
 Harald Auffarth
 Gustav Bachmann
 Curt Badinski
 Hermann Balck
 Hartmuth Baldamus
 Hermann Bauer
 Wilhelm Baur
 Ludwig Beck
 Carl Becker (general)
 Hermann Becker
 Hans Behlendorff
 Wilhelm Behrens
 Wilhelm Berlin
 Fritz Otto Bernert
 Hans Berr
 Rudolf Berthold
 Hans Bethge (aviator)
 Helmuth Beukemann
 Arnold Freiherr von Biegeleben
 Paul Billik
 Georg von Bismarck
 Johannes Blaskowitz
 Werner von Blomberg
 Walter Blume (aircraft designer)
 Leonhard Graf von Blumenthal
 Günther Blumentritt
 Fedor von Bock
 Max von Boehn (general)
 Oswald Boelcke
 Paul Bäumer
 Walter Boenicke
 Erwin Böhme
 Carl Bolle
 Heinrich Bongartz
 Walter Böning
 Kuno-Hans von Both
 Walter Braemer
 Franz Brandt
 Walther von Brauchitsch
 Otto Brauneck
 Ferdinand von Bredow
 Hermann Breith
 Franz Breithaupt
 Arthur von Briesen
 Kurt von Briesen
 Fritz von Brodowski
 Helmut Brümmer-Patzig
 Franz Büchner
 Hans-Joachim Buddecke
 Walther Buhle
 Harry von Bülow-Bothkamp
 Friedrich-Karl Burckhardt
 Wilhelm Burgdorf
 Ernst Busch (field marshal)
 Theodor Busse
 Eduard von Capelle
 Friedrich-Wilhelm von Chappuis
 Friedrich Christiansen
 Gerhard Conrad (pilot)
 Theodor Croneiss
 Hermann Dahlmann
 Alexander Edler von Daniels
 Jakob Ritter von Danner
 Franz Xaver Danhuber
 Carl Degelow
 Friedrich-Wilhelm Dernen
 Karl Dönitz
 Kurt-Bertram von Döring
 Albert Dossenbach
 Eduard Ritter von Dostler
 Kurt Eberhard
 Johann-Heinrich Eckhardt
 Theodor Endres
 Erwin Engelbrecht
 Franz Ritter von Epp
 Waldemar Erfurth
 Rudolf von Eschwege
 Walter Ewers
 Alexander von Falkenhausen
 Kurt von Falkowski
 Hans Feige
 Hermann Flörke
 Hermann Foertsch
 Werner Forst
 Helmuth Förster
 Otto-Wilhelm Förster
 Victor Franke
 Bruno Frankewitz
 Wilhelm Frankl
 Hans von Freden
 Otto Fretter-Pico
 Wilhelm Frickart
 Kurt Fricke
 Helmut Friebe
 Friedrich Friedrichs
 Werner von Fritsch
 Hermann Frommherz
 Heinz Furbach
 Martin Gareis
 Alfred Gerstenberg
 Hermann Geyer
 Werner von Gilsa
 Hermann Göring
 Heinrich Gontermann
 Walter Göttsch
 Justus Grassmann
 Ulrich Grauert
 Robert Ritter von Greim
 Karl-Albrecht von Groddeck
 Horst Großmann
 Curt Haase
 Siegfried Haenicke
 Erich Hahn
 Otto Hahn
 Kurt von Hammerstein-Equord
 Christian Hansen (general)
 Ludwig Hanstein
 Georg von Hantelmann
 Wilhelm Hasse (general)
 Bruno Ritter von Hauenschild
 Hans Hecker
 Heino von Heimburg
 Gotthard Heinrici
 Walter Heitz
 Franz Hemer
 Georg Ritter von Hengl
 Sigfrid Henrici
 Albert Henze
 Friedrich Herrlein
 Ernst Hess
 Wilhelm Heye
 Edmund Hoffmeister
 Adolf Wild von Hohenborn
 Fritz Höhn
 Walter Höhndorf
 Gustav Höhne
 Otto Höhne
 Harry Hoppe
 Hermann Hoth
 Hans Howaldt
 Hans-Valentin Hube
 Werner Hühner
 Joachim-Friedrich Huth
 Max Immelmann
 Erich Jaschke
 Ferdinand Jühlke
 Ernst Jünger
 Leonhard Kaupisch
 Walter Keiner
 Wilhelm Keitel
 Alfred Keller
 Hans von Keudell
 Werner Kienitz
 Eberhard Kinzel
 Heinrich Kirchheim
 Stefan Kirmaier
 Hans Kirschstein
 Heinrich Kittel
 Johannes Klein
 Günther von Kluge
 Hans von Koester
 Paul König
 Waldemar Kophamel
 Dietrich Kraiss
 Walther Krause
 Friedrich Freiherr Kress von Kressenstein
 Hans Kreysing
 Friedrich Wilhelm Kritzinger (theologian)
 Heinrich Kroll
 Friedrich Kühn
 Walter Kuntze
 Eberhard von Kurowski
 Walter Kypke
 Otto Lancelle
 Arthur Laumann
 Gustav Leffers
 Hans Leistikow
 Joachim Lemelsen
 Richard Lepper
 Hans-Georg Leyser
 Wilhelm List
 Bruno Loerzer
 Johannes Lohs
 Fritz von Loßberg
 Erich Loewenhardt
 Alfons Luczny
 Erich Lüdke
 Hartwig von Ludwiger
 Günther Lütjens
 Kurt-Jürgen Freiherr von Lützow
 Friedrich Lützow
 Siegfried Macholz
 Erich von Manstein
 Wilhelm Marschall
 Rudolf Meister
 Carl Menckhoff
 Georg Meyer (aviator)
 Walter Model
 Arthur Mülverstedt
 Max Näther
 Ulrich Neckel
 Karl August Nerger
 Friedrich Noltenius
 Theo Osterkamp
 Eugen Ott (general)
 Richard Pellengahr
 Rudolf Peschel
 Nicolae Petrescu-Comnen
 Walter Petzel
 Max Pfeffer
 Karl von Plettenberg
 Gunther Plüschow
 Werner Preuss
 Fritz Pütter
 Friedrich von Rabenau
 Antoni Wilhelm Radziwiłł
 Erich Raeder
 Adolf Raegener
 Johann von Ravenstein
 Hubert von Rebeur-Paschwitz
 Hermann Reinecke
 Wilhelm Reinhard (pilot)
 Georg-Hans Reinhardt
 Ludwig von Reuter
 Lothar von Richthofen
 Manfred von Richthofen
 Hans Rolfes
 Hans Rose
 Karl Rothenburg
 Hellmuth von Ruckteschell
 Günther Rüdel
 Alfred Saalwächter
 Erwin Sander
 Werner Sanne
 Dietrich von Saucken
 Karl Emil Schäfer
 Bruno Schatz
 Hans-Karl von Scheele
 Reinhard Scheer
 Hans Schilling (aviator)
 Alfred Schlemm
 Georg Schlenker
 Eberhard Graf von Schmettow
 Arthur Schmidt (general)
 August Schmidt (Luftwaffe)
 Gustav Schmidt (general)
 Hans Schmidt (general of the Infantry)
 Otto Schmidt (aviator)
 Eugen Ritter von Schobert
 Viktor Schobinger
 Carl-August von Schoenebeck
 Otto von Schrader
 Walther Schroth
 Otto Schultze
 Johannes Schulz
 Günter Schwartzkopff
 Viktor von Schwedler
 Walther von Seydlitz-Kurzbach
 Johann Sinnhuber
 Friedrich Sixt von Armin
 Karl-Wilhelm Specht
 Hugo Sperrle
 Paul Strähle
 Peter Strasser
 Adolf Strauss (general)
 Kurt Student
 Otto von Stülpnagel
 Wolff von Stutterheim
 Walter Surén
 Emil Thuy
 Horst Julius Freiherr Treusch von Buttlar-Brandenfels
 Adolf von Trotha
 Adolf Ritter von Tutschek
 Ernst Udet
 Max Ulich
 Walter von Unruh
 Josef Veltjens
 Heinrich von Vietinghoff
 Werner Voss
 Franz Walz
 Walter Warzecha
 Erich Rüdiger von Wedel
 Friedrich-August Weinknecht
 Wilhelm Wetzel
 Hans Weiss (aviator)
 Walther Wever (general)
 Thomas-Emil von Wickede
 Gustav Anton von Wietersheim
 Helmuth Wilberg
 Rudolf Windisch
 Erwin von Witzleben
 Kurt Wolff (aviator)
 Eberhard Wolfram
 Kurt Wüsthoff
 Heinz Ziegler
 Hans Zorn

Members 

 Prince Albert of Saxe-Altenburg
 Fritz Beckhardt
 Sebastian Festner
 Fritz Kosmahl
 Max Ritter von Müller
 Karl Thom

Unknown Class

 Leopold Anslinger
 Erwin Böhme
 Adolf von Bonin
 Hans-Eberhardt Gandert
 Franz Halder
 Paul Hausser
 Erich Hoepner
 Hermann Köhl
 Günther Korten
 Wilhelm Ritter von Leeb
 Walter von Reichenau
 Wilhelm Reinhard (SS officer)
 Hugo Rüdel
 Gerd von Rundstedt
 Franz Schleiff
 Albrecht von Thaer
 Wilhelm Werner (SS officer)

Orders, decorations, and medals of Prussia
Orders of chivalry of Germany
Awards established in 1841